Cirsium occidentale, with the common name cobweb thistle or cobwebby thistle, is a North American species of thistle in the family Asteraceae.

Description

Cirsium occidentale is a biennial plant forming a taproot. It may be short or quite tall, forming low clumps or towering to heights approaching . The petioles are winged and spiny and the leaves are toothed or edged with triangular lobes.

The inflorescence at the top of the whitish stem holds one to several flower heads. Each head is sphere-like, covered in large phyllaries with very long, spreading spines which are laced, often quite heavily, in fibers resembling cobwebs.

The head is packed with disc florets which may be white to blood red to shades of purple. The largest flower heads exceed  in diameter. The heads do not open in synchrony, perhaps allowing greater likelihood of being pollinated.

Varieties 
There are several varieties, which differ from each other in range and form:

Cirsium occidentale var. californicum — California thistle
Cirsium occidentale var. candidissimum — snowy thistle
Cirsium occidentale var. compactum — compact cobwebby thistle; a short, clumpy California endemic that grows only along the coast of the San Francisco Bay Area and the Central Coast of California
Cirsium occidentale var. coulteri — Coulter's thistle
Cirsium occidentale var. lucianum — Cuesta Ridge thistle; a California endemic from the Santa Lucia Range
Cirsium occidentale var. occidentale — cobwebby thistle
Cirsium occidentale var. venustum

Distribution and habitat 
The plant is widespread and fairly common across most of California: in its mountain ranges, valleys, and the Mojave Desert; and in the western Great Basin region in western Nevada, southern Oregon, and southwestern Idaho.

Unlike many introduced thistles, this native species is not a troublesome weed.

Ecology 
It is a larval host to the California crescent, mylitta crescent, and the painted lady butterfly.

Gallery

References

External links
Jepson Manual treatment — Cirsium occidentale
Cirsium occidentale — Calphotos Photo gallery, University of California

occidentale
Flora of the Western United States
Natural history of the California chaparral and woodlands
Natural history of the California Coast Ranges
Natural history of the Mojave Desert
Natural history of the Peninsular Ranges
Natural history of the San Francisco Bay Area
Natural history of the Santa Monica Mountains
Natural history of the Transverse Ranges
Plants described in 1901
Taxa named by Thomas Nuttall
Taxa named by Willis Linn Jepson